Micromussa is a genus of stony corals in the family Lobophylliidae.

Species
The World Register of Marine Species currently lists the following species:
 Micromussa amakusensis (Veron, 1990)
 Micromussa indiana Benzoni & Arrigoni, 2016
 Micromussa lordhowensis (Veron & Pichon, 1982)
 Micromussa multipunctata (Hodgson, 1985)
 Micromussa pacifica Benzoni & Arrigoni, 2016
 Micromussa regularis (Veron, 2000)

References

Lobophylliidae
Scleractinia genera